This is a list of notable events in country music that took place in the year 1999.

Events
March 6 — George Jones, in the midst of a comeback this year, is seriously injured when he crashed his Lexus into a bridge. It is later revealed that alcohol was a factor in the accident, and he pleaded guilty to drunk driving charges.
June — Comedian Jeff Foxworthy debuts his syndicated radio countdown show, "The Foxworthy Countdown." The radio show would end ten years later.
September 4 — Lonestar's hit, "Amazed", spends its eighth week at No. 1 on the Billboard magazine Hot Country Singles & Tracks chart, becoming the first song to do so since Jack Greene's 1966 hit, "There Goes My Everything." In several other trade magazines, including Radio & Records, "Amazed" reigns for nine weeks, which made it the longest-lasting Number One single since 1966's "Almost Persuaded" by David Houston. By year's end, "Amazed" is gaining popularity on CHR and adult contemporary stations (in re-mixed versions, which excised the steel guitar).
 September 22 - Alan Jackson sings the chorus of George Jones' "Choices" in the middle of his performance of "Pop a Top" on the Country Music Association Awards broadcast, after TV producers required that Jones perform an abridged version, in which he refused and boycotted the show. The performance has become one of the best and most memorable moments in CMA history.
 September 28 - Garth Brooks releases In the Life of Chris Gaines, a compilation album of Brooks' alter ego, fictional Australian rock star Chris Gaines. The album was intended to be the soundtrack to a film called The Lamb, however the film was never filmed, due to financial and management problems. The album received disappointing sales in comparison to Brooks' other albums.

Top hits of the year

Singles released by American artists

Singles released by Canadian artists

Top new album releases

Other top albums

Deaths
February 8 – Lulu Belle (born Myrtle Eleanor Cooper), 85, one-half of the 1930s–1940s husband-and-wife duo Lulu Belle and Scotty, later a state Representative in the North Carolina Legislature.
 September 30 — Connie Eaton, 49, singer of the 1970s (cancer) 
 October 2 — Danny Mayo, 49, writer of hit singles by Alabama, Confederate Railroad, Pirates of the Mississippi, and Tracy Byrd, father of songwriter Aimee Mayo (heart attack)
December 17 — Rex Allen, 78, "The Arizona Cowboy" and traveling rodeo performer.
December 20 — Hank Snow, 85, "The Singing Ranger," best known for "I'm Movin' On."

Hall of Fame inductees

Bluegrass Music Hall of Fame inductees
Kenny Baker

Country Music Hall of Fame inductees
Johnny Bond (1915–1978)
Dolly Parton (born 1946)
Conway Twitty (1933–1993)

Canadian Country Music Hall of Fame inductees
Ronnie Prophet
Walt Grealis

Major awards

Grammy Awards
Best Female Country Vocal Performance — "Man! I Feel Like a Woman!", Shania Twain
Best Male Country Vocal Performance — "Choices", George Jones
Best Country Performance by a Duo or Group with Vocal — "Ready to Run", Dixie Chicks
Best Country Collaboration with Vocals — "After the Gold Rush", Emmylou Harris, Dolly Parton and Linda Ronstadt
Best Country Instrumental Performance — "Bob's Breakdowns", Tommy Allsup, Asleep at the Wheel, Floyd Domino, Larry Franklin, Vince Gill and Steve Wariner
Best Country Song — "Come on Over", Shania Twain and Robert John "Mutt" Lange
Best Country Album — Fly, Dixie Chicks
Best Bluegrass Album — Ancient Tones, Ricky Skaggs & Kentucky Thunder

Juno Awards
Best Country Male Artist — Paul Brandt
Best Country Female Artist — Shania Twain
Best Country Group or Duo — The Rankins

Academy of Country Music
Entertainer of the Year — Shania Twain
Song of the Year — "Amazed", Marv Green, Aimee Mayo
Single of the Year — "Amazed", Lonestar
Album of the Year — Fly, Dixie Chicks
Top Male Vocalist — Tim McGraw
Top Female Vocalist — Faith Hill
Top Vocal Duo or Group — Dixie Chicks
Top New Male Vocalist — Brad Paisley
Top New Female Vocalist — Jessica Andrews
Top New Vocal Duo or Group — Montgomery Gentry
Video of the Year — "Breathe", Faith Hill (Director: Lili Fini Zanuck)
Vocal Event of the Year — "When I Said I Do", Clint Black with Lisa Hartman Black

ARIA Awards 
(presented in Sydney on October 12, 1999)
Best Country Album - The Captain (Kasey Chambers)
ARIA Hall of Fame - Jimmy Little

Canadian Country Music Association
CMT Maple Leaf Foods Fans' Choice Award — Shania Twain
Male Artist of the Year — Paul Brandt
Female Artist of the Year — Shania Twain
Group or Duo of the Year — The Wilkinsons
SOCAN Song of the Year — "26 Cents", Steve Wilkinson, William Wallace
Single of the Year — "26 Cents", The Wilkinsons
Album of the Year — Nothing but Love, The Wilkinsons
Top Selling Album — Wide Open Spaces, Dixie Chicks
Video of the Year — "That Don't Impress Me Much", Shania Twain
Wrangler Rising Star Award — The Wilkinsons
Vocal/Instrumental Collaboration of the Year — "From This Moment On", Shania Twain and Bryan White

Country Music Association
Entertainer of the Year — Shania Twain
Song of the Year — "This Kiss", Robin Lerner, Annie Roboff and Beth Nielsen Chapman
Single of the Year — "Wide Open Spaces", Dixie Chicks
Album of the Year — A Place in the Sun, Tim McGraw
Male Vocalist of the Year — Tim McGraw
Female Vocalist of the Year — Martina McBride
Vocal Duo of the Year — Brooks & Dunn
Vocal Group of the Year — Dixie Chicks
Horizon Award — Jo Dee Messina
Music Video of the Year — "Wide Open Spaces", Dixie Chicks (Director: Thom Oliphant)
Vocal Event of the Year — "My Kind of Woman, My Kind of Man", Vince Gill and Patty Loveless
Musician of the Year — Randy Scruggs

RPM Big Country Awards
Canadian Country Artist of the Year — Shania Twain
Best Country Album — Nothing but Love, The Wilkinsons
Best Country Single — "26 Cents", The Wilkinsons
Male Artist of the Year — Paul Brandt
Female Artist of the Year — Shania Twain
Group of the Year — The Wilkinsons
Outstanding New Male Artist — Gil Grand
Outstanding New Female Artist — Stephanie Beaumont
Outstanding New Group or Duo — The Johner Brothers
Canadian Country Video — "26 Cents", The Wilkinsons
Top Country Composer(s) — Bruce Guthro

Further reading
Whitburn, Joel, "Top Country Songs 1944–2005 – 6th Edition." 2005.

Other links
Country Music Association
Inductees of the Country Music Hall of Fame

External links
Country Music Hall of Fame

Country
Country music by year